2007–08 in Kenyan football may refer to:
 2007 in Kenyan football
 2008 in Kenyan football